"I'll Tell Me Ma" (also called "The Wind") is a traditional children's song. It was collected in various parts of the United Kingdom in the 19th century and again appears in collections from shortly after the turn of the 20th century. In Ireland, especially within Ulster, the chorus usually refers to Belfast city and is known colloquially as "The Belle of Belfast City", although it is also adapted to other Irish cities, such as Dublin. Other versions refer to the "Golden City" or "London City".
This song is Roud Folk Song Index number 2649.

The song accompanies a children's game. A ring is formed by the children joining hands, one player standing in the centre. When asked, "Please tell me who they be," the girl in the middle gives the name or initials of a boy in the ring (or vice versa). The ring then sings the rest of the words, and the boy who was named goes into the centre.

Opening verse and chorus 
I'll tell me ma, when I get home
The boys won't leave the girls alone
Pulled me hair, and stole my comb
But that's alright, till I go home.

Chorus:
She is handsome, she is pretty
She is the belle of __ __  city
She is a-courting one, two, three
Pray, can you tell me who is she?

Recordings and renditions

The song has been covered on numerous albums, some of which have adapted the lyrics to their locales.

One of the more notable renditions was by Van Morrison and The Chieftains, for their collaboration record Irish Heartbeat in 1988; the album reached number 18 on the UK Albums Chart.  The song was guest-sung by Ronnie Drew of The Dubliners on The Chieftains album Live From Dublin: A Tribute To Derek Bell in 2005. The Chieftains also played the song with Cartoon Network character Brak for the latter's variety show special, Brak Presents the Brak Show Starring Brak and related album in 2000.

Sham Rock released a popular rendition of the song set to a dance beat titled "Tell Me Ma" in 1998. The single reached number 13 on the UK Singles Chart, remained on the charts for 17 weeks, and sold over 200,000 copies. It has been included on various compilation albums that have sold a total of over 3 million copies.

Other notable recordings include:
 Uncle Dave Macon, as part of "Run, Nigger, Run" on Early Recordings (Uncle Dave Macon), 1924-1925. The song uses the lyrics 'Tell my mammy when I go home, Girls won't let them boys alone'. https://en.wikipedia.org/wiki/Run,_Nigger,_Run
 The Clancy Brothers and Tommy Makem, as "I'll Tell My Ma" on The Boys Won't Leave The Girls Alone, 1962. The album title is a lyric from the song.
 The Corries, as part of "The Singing Games" on The Corrie Folk Trio and Paddie Bell, 1964.  The song uses the lyric "She's the girl of the windy city"
 The Dubliners as "I'll Tell My Ma" on their debut album The Dubliners with Luke Kelly, 1964.
 Lick the Tins, as "The Belle of Belfast City (Roud 2649)", on Blind Man on a Flying Horse, 1986. It was first released as a single.
 The Rankin Family as "Tell My Ma", on their second album Fare Thee Well Love, 1990, and on their re-released album North Country, 1993.
 Four to the Bar, on their live album Craic on the Road, 1994.
 Orthodox Celts, on The Celts Strike Again, 1997 - This version uses the lyric "She's the belle of Belgrade City" in reference to their home town.
 The Wiggles did a rendition of this called "Nya, Nya, Nya" which is found on the video Wiggledance!, and album The Wiggles Movie Soundtrack, both released in 1997. They would later sing "I'll Tell Me Ma" on the album, Apples & Bananas, 2014.
 Gaelic Storm as "Tell Me Ma" on their debut album Gaelic Storm, 1998.
 Belfast Food, on Za to Zato, 1999.
 The Tossers as "Maidrin Rua / Tell Me Ma" on Communication & Conviction: Last Seven Years, 2001. This version uses the lyric "She is the belle of Dublin city".
 Sinéad O'Connor, on Sean-Nós Nua, 2002
 The Poxy Boggards as "Tell Me Ma", on Whiskey Business, 2006.
 The Young Dubliners, on With All Due Respect - The Irish Sessions, 2007 This version uses the lyric "She is the belle of Dublin city".
 Beatnik Turtle as "Tell Me Ma", on Sham Rock, 2008.
 Christy Moore, on an extended version of his song "Lisdoonvarna", sings a verse of "I'll Tell Me Ma", on Live at Vicar Street, 2002
 The Irish Tenors, on Ellis Island, 2001
 Orla Fallon, Live With The Dubliners And Damien Dempsey, on My Land, 2011.
The Rumjacks, on "Hung, Drawn & Portered", 2009
 Northern Irish punk band The Undertones reference this song in their song "Top Twenty", a B-side of "Here Comes the Summer" by lifting the line "The boys won't leave the girls alone."
 Celtic Thunder recorded a short version on their "Voyage" album, which included two other traditional Irish folk tunes. (The other two being "Courtin' in the Kitchen" and "The Irish rover".) The Medley was given the title of "The Clancy Bros. Medley".
As "The Golden City" the song features three times in The Singing Street, a film of children's songs featuring Edinburgh school pupils, made in 1950.

Parodies
 Marc Gunn did a parody called "I'll Tell My Cat" on Irish Drinking Songs for Cat Lovers, 2005

References

External links
 Roud 2649 at Vaughan Williams Memorial Library - this lists alternate titles and renditions including "The Wind" and "The Rain Rains Down"
 
 

Irish folk songs
English children's songs
British children's entertainment
1988 singles
Traditional children's songs
Van Morrison songs
The Dubliners songs
Year of song unknown
Songwriter unknown
19th-century songs